Benjamin Arnett Mitchell (November 14, 1895 – 1934), nicknamed "Hooks", was an American Negro league pitcher in the 1920s.

A native of Jacksonville, Florida, Mitchell was the brother of fellow-Negro leaguer Alonzo Mitchell. Older brother Arnett made his Negro leagues debut in 1921 for the Bacharach Giants. He finished his career in 1926 with short stints for the Harrisburg Giants and Baltimore Black Sox. He was released by the Bacharach Giants in June 1924, but returned to the club in 1925. Mitchell died in Jacksonville in 1934 at age 38 or 39.

References

External links
 and Baseball-Reference Black Baseball stats and Seamheads

1895 births
1934 deaths
Date of death missing
Bacharach Giants players
Baltimore Black Sox players
Harrisburg Giants players
Richmond Giants players
Baseball pitchers
Baseball players from Jacksonville, Florida
20th-century African-American sportspeople